The National Championship was the next stage from the regional stage of 2021–22 Thai League 3. The winners and runners-ups of each region would qualify for this round to find 3 clubs promoting to 2022–23 Thai League 2.

Teams

Group stage

Upper region

Lower region

Knockout stage
Winners, runners-up, and third place of 2021–22 Thai League 3 would be promoted to the 2022–23 Thai League 2.

Third place play-off

Summary

|}

Matches

Nakhon Si United won 4–3 on aggregate.

Final

Summary

|}

Matches

Uthai Thani won 3–1 on aggregate.

Teams promoted to 2022–23 Thai League 2
 Uthai Thani (champions)
 Krabi (runners-up)
 Nakhon Si United (third-placed)

References

Thai League 3
3